Javier F. Asbun (born 1 June 1953) is a Bolivian sports shooter. He competed in the mixed trap event at the 1984 Summer Olympics.

References

External links
 

1953 births
Living people
Bolivian male sport shooters
Olympic shooters of Bolivia
Shooters at the 1984 Summer Olympics
Place of birth missing (living people)